Digging for the Truth is a History Channel television series that ran from 2005 to 2007. The first three seasons of the show focused on host Josh Bernstein, who journeyed on various explorations of historical icons and mysteries. Bernstein is the president and CEO of BOSS (Boulder Outdoor Survival School) and has a degree in anthropology and psychology from Cornell University. The show aired Monday nights at 9:00 EST on the History Channel. The series premiered in January 2005 and at the time was the highest-rated series currently running on The History Channel, which was surprising given the previous show Time Titans from the production crew never made it past the pilot. The third season premiered on January 22, 2007, with a two-hour special event on the quest for Atlantis.

Bernstein announced on February 20, 2007, that he would be leaving The History Channel and Digging for the Truth, and would, as of April, join The Discovery Channel as an executive producer and host of a new prime-time series and specials. Hunter Ellis, host of Tactical to Practical and Man, Moment, Machine for The History Channel, then replaced Bernstein as host.

Each episode typically dealt with an event or subject in history that is not completely understood by modern historians. As such, many of the topics covered are controversial in some respect. Bernstein usually mentioned the various theories that exist on the subject, although the episode may not have explored all of them. He then traveled to various locations to ask questions of researchers, and he often he put himself into situations (e.g. working in a quarry, climbing a rock-face) that simulated the activities of people in the period he explored. Almost all of the researchers he talked to were professionals in the subject at hand, and many of the places he visited (e.g., the inside of a pyramid) are not open to the general public. At the end of each episode, he pulled together everything discussed in the episode to either formulate a hypothesis of what happened or to conclude that what happened remains a mystery.

In late 2006, Bernstein's book Digging for the Truth: One Man's Epic Adventure Exploring the World's Greatest Archaeological Mysteries was published. In the book, Bernstein writes a bit about his past and BOSS, but it is mostly a behind-the-scene look at various episodes.

Episodes

References

External links
 

History (American TV channel) original programming
Public archaeology
2005 American television series debuts